George William Beadle was a New Zealand rugby league player who represented New Zealand.

Playing career
Beadle represented South Auckland and was selected for the 1939-40 New Zealand tour of Great Britain. The touring party had arrived in Britain and played in several tour games before the outbreak of World War II meant the tour was abandoned without any test matches being played.

Death
Beadle was killed in a mining accident in Huntly on July 1, 1944, aged 28. He was crushed by a fall of coal. All the rugby league matches played by his United club area were cancelled as a mark of respect.

References

New Zealand rugby league players
New Zealand national rugby league team players
Waikato rugby league team players
Rugby league props